New Hampshire's 18th State Senate district is one of 24 districts in the New Hampshire Senate. It has  been represented by Democrat Donna Soucy, formerly the President of the New Hampshire Senate, since 2012.

Geography
District 18 is based in Manchester, covering the city's 5th, 6th, 7th, 8th, and 9th wards as well as the nearby town of Litchfield, all in Hillsborough County.

The district overlaps with both New Hampshire's 1st congressional district and New Hampshire's 2nd congressional district.

Recent election results

2020

2018

2016

2014

2012

Federal and statewide results in District 18

References

18
Hillsborough County, New Hampshire